German International School Dubai (DISD) is a German international school in Academic City, Dubai, United Arab Emirates. It serves kindergarten and grades 1–12.

It was established in 2008. As of February 2015 the school has over 500 students in school grades and over 100 in kindergarten. The German International School Dubai moved to its new campus in Academic City in the 2015–2016 school year.

The school proctors the Abitur exam.

References

External links
 German International School Dubai
 German International School Dubai 

Educational institutions established in 2008
2008 establishments in the United Arab Emirates
International schools in Dubai
Dubai